Bags and Boxes 3 is the ninth mixtape by English hip hop recording artist Blade Brown. It was released independently on 31 October 2014 and it served as the follow-up to his 2012 mixtape Bags and Boxes 2. The mixtape features guest appearances from Young Spray, Mental K, Big Chess, Gunna Dee, Skepta, Skrapz, Fekky, Colours Miyagi, Little Torment, Vile Greeze, Tigger da Author, G FrSH, Youngs Teflon, Paper Pabs, Skwilla Da Gorrilla, Rain and J Spades.

Track listing
Intro 2:22
Don't Need to Be Said 2:34
Money Songs 3:29
Black Jeep (feat. Young Spray) 4:03
Trafficking 2:34
Facts (feat. Mental K & Big Chess) 4:18
Cold Summer 2:40
Games Fake (feat. Gunna Dee) 3:42
Never See You There (feat. Skepta) 3:15
I Want in (feat. Skrapz) 3:15
Trick (feat. Fekky) 3:12
Wake up (feat. Colours) 2:52
D Girl 3:17
Eyes Closed 3:02
Smoking (feat. Little Torment & Vile Greeze) 4:25 
Drug Dealer (feat. Tigger da Author) 3:09
Got It on Him (feat. Gfrsh) 3:23
Come Up 3:31
Power (feat. Youngs Teflon & Paper Pabs) 3:42
Who You Talking to (feat. Skwilla Sdg) 2:25
Unrealistic (feat. Rain) 3:36
Outro / Pounds 3:42
Showtime Remix (feat. J Spades & Youngs Teflon) 4:50

References

2014 mixtape albums
Blade Brown albums